Bosnia and Herzegovina appeared for the first time in a FIFA World Cup at the 2014 FIFA World Cup in Brazil, and remains the only time the team participated at a major international tournament to date.

Although Serbia is accepted by FIFA as the official successor of Yugoslavia, Bosnian players have played a role in World Cup history before their independence in 1992.

Yugoslavia qualified for the World Cup eight times between 1930 and 1990. While in the early editions Yugoslavia was mainly represented by Serbs, the squads grew more inclusive over time.

A notable early appearance of a Bosnian player at a FIFA World Cup was in 1962, when striker Muhamed Mujić broke an opponent's leg in a brutal foul. Although he was not carded by the referee, he was sent home by his own federation and was never called up for an international match again.

More positively, several Bosnian players were part of the 1974 first team line-up that advanced from the group stage unbeaten and ahead of Brazil. Striker Dušan Bajević scored three goals in one of the highest World Cup victories of all time: Yugoslavia's 9–0 against Zaire. Defender Josip Katalinski also scored during that game. Other Bosnians from that years team include goalkeeper Enver Marić and defender Enver Hadžiabdić.

Playmaker Safet Sušić, often considered to be the best Bosnian player of all time, represented Yugoslavia at the World Cup both in 1982 and 1990. The team that reached the quarter finals in 1990 was captained by Zlatko Vujović, another player of Bosnian heritage.

FIFA World Cup record

After Bosnia and Herzegovina gained independence from Yugoslavia on 1 March 1992, the national football team was soon formed but could not enter qualifying for 1994 World Cup as the national association was not yet a member of FIFA. During qualifiers for 1998 World Cup, Bosnia's first home match against Croatia was played at Bologna. The match was held at the neutral venue due to the renovation of the Asim Ferhatović Hase Stadium.

The team finished in third place during 2006 World Cup qualifying, recording two draws with Spain along the way. During qualifiers for 2010 World Cup Bosnia reached its first ever playoffs for a major tournament, though eventually losing to Portugal 2–0 on aggregate.

The 2014 World Cup is the first time Bosnia has appeared at a major tournament as an independent nation, having qualified as winners of UEFA Group G.

List of matches

Record players 
Six players were fielded in all of Bosnia and Herzegovina's matches at the 2014 World Cup, making them record players for their country.

Top goalscorers 
Four players scored one goal each for Bosnia and Herzegovina at the 2014 FIFA World Cup. In addition, an own goal was scored by left-back Sead Kolašinac in their match against Argentina, which holds the record for fastest own goal at a FIFA World Cup at two minutes and six seconds.

Squads

References

External links
Bosnia at FIFA

 
Bosnia and Herzegovina
Football in Bosnia and Herzegovina